Thomas Samuel Burns (born June 7, 1945) is an American historian who is Samuel Candler Dobbs Professor Emeritus of Late Ancient and Medieval History at Emory University. He specializes on relations between "barbarians" and Romans in classical antiquity.

Biography
Thomas S. Burns was born in Michigan City, Indiana on June 7, 1945. He received his A.B. (1967) from Wabash College and his M.A. (1968) and Ph.D. (1974) from the University of Michigan. His thesis was supervised by Sylvia L. Trupp and John W. Eadie. 

After gaining his Ph.D., Burns served as Assistant Professor (1974-1980) and then Associate Professor (1980-1985) of History at Emory University. Since 1985, Burns was Samuel Candler Dobbs Professor of Late Ancient and Medieval History at Emory University (1985-2010). He was Chair of the Department of History at Emory University in 1989-1992 and 2006-2007. Burns retired as S. C. Dobbs Professor Emeritus in 2010.

Burns specializes in late ancient and early medieval history and archaeology. He is particularly interested in relationships between "barbarians" and Romans. Burns is well known as an authority on the Ostrogoths.

Selected works
 The Ostrogoths: Kingship and Society, 1980
 A History of the Ostrogoths, 1984
 Barbarians within the Gates of Rome: Roman Military Policy and the Barbarians, ca. 375-425 A.D., 1994
 Rome and the Barbarians, 100 BC - AD 400, 2003

See also
 Peter Heather
 Herwig Wolfram
 E. A. Thompson
 Walter Goffart
 Ian N. Wood
 Patrick J. Geary

Sources
 
 

1945 births
Living people
American historians
American non-fiction writers
Emory University faculty
Historians of antiquity
People from Michigan City, Indiana
Wabash College alumni
University of Michigan alumni